In computing, cut is a command line utility on Unix and Unix-like operating systems which is used to extract sections from each line of input — usually from a file. It is currently part of the GNU coreutils package and the BSD Base System.

Extraction of line segments can typically be done by bytes (-b), characters (-c), or fields (-f) separated by a delimiter (-d — the tab character by default). A range must be provided in each case which consists of one of N, N-M, N- (N to the end of the line), or -M (beginning of the line to M), where N and M are counted from 1 (there is no zeroth value). Since version 6, an error is thrown if you include a zeroth value. Prior to this the value was ignored and assumed to be 1.

History
 is part of the X/Open Portability Guide since issue 2 of 1987. It was inherited into the first version of POSIX.1 and the Single Unix Specification. It first appeared in AT&T System III UNIX in 1982.

The version of cut bundled in GNU coreutils was written by David M. Ihnat, David MacKenzie, and Jim Meyering. The command is available as a separate package for Microsoft Windows as part of the UnxUtils collection of native Win32 ports of common GNU Unix-like utilities. The  command has also been ported to the IBM i operating system.

Examples
Assuming a file named "file" containing the lines:
 foo:bar:baz:qux:quux
 one:two:three:four:five:six:seven
 alpha:beta:gamma:delta:epsilon:zeta:eta:theta:iota:kappa:lambda:mu
 the quick brown fox jumps over the lazy dog

To output the fourth through tenth characters of each line:
$ cut -c 4-10 file
:bar:ba
:two:th
ha:beta
 quick 
To output the fifth field through the end of the line of each line using the colon character as the field delimiter:
$ cut -d ":" -f 5- file
quux
five:six:seven
epsilon:zeta:eta:theta:iota:kappa:lambda:mu
the quick brown fox jumps over the lazy dog

(note that because the colon character is not found in the last line the entire line is shown)

Option -d specified a single character delimiter (in the example above it is a colon) which serves as field separator. Option -f which specifies range of fields included in the output (here fields range from five till the end). Option -d presupposes usage of option -f.

To output the third field of each line using space as the field delimiter:
$ cut -d " " -f 3 file
foo:bar:baz:qux:quux
one:two:three:four:five:six:seven
alpha:beta:gamma:delta:epsilon:zeta:eta:theta:iota:kappa:lambda:mu
brown
(Note that because the space character is not found in the first three lines these entire lines are shown.)

To separate two words having any delimiter:
$ line=process.processid
$ cut -d "." -f1 <<< $line
process
$ cut -d "." -f2 <<< $line
processid

Syntax
 cut [-b list] [-c list] [-f list] [-n] [-d delim] [-s] [file]

Flags which may be used include:
   Bytes; a list following  specifies a range of bytes which will be returned, e.g.  would return the first 66 bytes of a line. NNB.  will only work on input lines of less than 1023 bytes
   Characters; a list following  specifies a range of characters which will be returned, e.g.  would return the first 66 characters of a line
   Specifies a field list, separated by a delimiter
 list  A comma separated or blank separated list of integer denoted fields, incrementally ordered.
   Used in combination with -b suppresses splits of multi-byte characters
   Delimiter; the character immediately following the  option is the field delimiter for use in conjunction with the  option; the default delimiter is tab. Space and other characters with special meanings within the context of the shell in use must be enquoted or escaped as necessary.
   Bypasses lines which contain no field delimiters when  is specified, unless otherwise indicated.
 file  The file (and accompanying path if necessary) to process as input. If no file is specified then standard input will be used.

See also
 List of Unix commands
 grep
 paste (Unix)
 sed
 awk

References

External links

 
 Softpanorama cut page.
 Cut out selected fields of each line of a file A portrait of cut(1) and its historical background.

Unix text processing utilities
Standard Unix programs
Unix SUS2008 utilities
IBM i Qshell commands